Jon James St. Andre (December 8, 1939 – July 11, 2017) was an American ski jumper who competed in the 1960 Winter Olympics. He was born in Ishpeming, Michigan.

References

1939 births
2017 deaths
American male ski jumpers
Olympic ski jumpers of the United States
Ski jumpers at the 1960 Winter Olympics
Place of birth missing